Abdoulaye Diakate (born 16 January 1988) is a Senegalese professional footballer who plays for Kazakhstan Premier League club Caspiy as a midfielder.

Career
Diakate began his professional career began in 2008 with Turkish TFF First League side Kartal, moving to fellow First League side Sakaryaspor halfway through the season. The following season Diakate played for Çaykur Rizespor, also in the TFF First League, before leaving the club at the end of the season. Diakate's next club was Kazakhstan Premier League side FC Taraz, for whom he made 83 league appearances, before moving to Ordabasy. In February 2015, Diakate signed for FC Atyrau.

Career statistics

Club

References

1988 births
Living people
Senegalese footballers
TFF First League players
Kazakhstan Premier League players
Sakaryaspor footballers
Çaykur Rizespor footballers
FC Ordabasy players
FC Taraz players
FC Atyrau players
FC Turan players
Senegalese expatriate footballers
Expatriate footballers in Turkey
Expatriate footballers in Kazakhstan
Association football midfielders